Rosedale Center, commonly known just as Rosedale, is a shopping center in Roseville, Minnesota.  The mall is surrounded by suburbs and close to major highways and serves a trade area population almost 2 million people, and boasts 14 million visitors annually.

The mall's anchor stores are Macy's, AMC Theatres, DSW, Rocco Altobelli, Evereve, Carter's, Loft, Williams Sonoma, JoS. A. Bank, Talbots, Von Maur, Becker Furniture World, JCPenney, and SeaQuest. There is 1 vacant anchor store that was once Herberger's.

History

First announced in 1966 as a third enclosed mall development to be anchored by both Dayton's and Donaldson's, the Roseville, Minnesota site was chosen because of the population grown in northern Ramsey County. The 150-acre tract of land had previously been purchased by Donaldson's in 1952 for a shopping center that had never developed. Opened in 1969, it is the third of the "dale" shopping centers built by the Dayton Hudson Corporation.  Southdale Center (1956), in Edina, Minnesota was the first.  This was followed by Brookdale Center (1962) in Brooklyn Center, and later by Ridgedale Center (1974) in Minnetonka.

Originally, Rosedale was anchored by Dayton's and Donaldson's department stores. A JCPenney was added, as part of a new North Wing, in 1976; a Montgomery Ward also joined in the 1970s. The mall underwent a major renovation that was completed in 1992. A new Dayton's was added as well (later became Marshall Field's in 2001, now Macy's) (the old Dayton's was rebuilt as new retail spaces). Two parking garages were constructed as well.

The vacant east anchor (originally a Donaldson's, then a Carson Pirie Scott and Mervyn's) was demolished in 2005. Developers built a new, open-air, lifestyle wing, anchored by an AMC theater. This expansion, officially known as the Plaza at Rosedale Center, was dedicated in November 2006.  The 14-screen AMC was completed the next month.

In 2015, the Rosedale Center announced a 140,000-square-foot expansion project that opened on October 10, 2018.
It includes a Von Maur department store. The project removed 369 current parking spaces, but also built a parking deck to add 450 spaces, a net gain of 81 parking spaces.

Despite a recent remodel from the expansion, Bon-Ton announced on April 17, 2018, the liquidation of all Herberger's stores, 200+ locations, after two liquidators, Great American Group and Tiger Capital Group, won an auction for the company. This closing included all Herberger's stores; as well as the Rosedale location. Herberger's closed for the final time on August 30, 2018.

In May of 2020, the mall and several surrounding stores were looted during the George Floyd protests.

Shopping
Following the success of their stores in New York, the Macy's at Rosedale Center became their first store in Minnesota to have 24-hour shopping during the 2009 Christmas season.

References

External links
Rosedale Center in Google Maps

Shopping malls in Minnesota
Shopping malls established in 1969
Tourist attractions in Ramsey County, Minnesota
Buildings and structures in Roseville, Minnesota